Leptotes pirithous, the Lang's short-tailed blue or common zebra blue, is a butterfly of the family Lycaenidae.

Description
Leptotes pirithous is a small butterfly with a wingspan of 21–29 mm in males and 24–30 mm in females. The uppersides of the wings are purple bluish in males, bluish brown in female. The undersides are dark beige striped with white lines. The hindwings show marginal orange and black spots and two small tails. For the design of the undersides of the wings they can be confused with Lampides boeticus and Cacyreus marshalli. These butterflies fly from February to November depending on the location. They are regular migrants.

The larvae feed on the flowers and fruits of Fabaceae, Rosaceae and Plumbaginaceae species, including  Plumbago capensis, Indigofera, Rynchosia, Vigna, Burkea, Mundulea, Melilotus, Crataegus, Quercus suber, Medicago sativa, Trifolium alexandrinum, Arachis hypogaea, Lythrum, Calluna, Genista, Dorycnium, Lythrum salicaria, Calluna vulgaris, Onobrychis viciifolia, Ulex and Melilotus alba. A life cycle takes about four to eight weeks, depending on the temperature.

Distribution
This species can be found in southern Europe (Spain, France and Italy), along the Mediterranean coast, in Asia Minor up to the Himalayas, and in most of Africa and Madagascar.

Subspecies

The following subspecies have been identified: 
Leptotes pirithous pirithous (southern Europe, Caucasus, Transcaucasia, North Africa)
Leptotes pirithous capverti Libert, Baliteau & Baliteau, 2011 (island of Santo Antão, Cape Verde) 
Leptotes pirithous insulanus (Aurivillius, 1924) (Mozambique Channel)

Habitat
This species prefers varied wasteland, cultivated areas and gardens.

References

Pirithous
Butterflies of Africa
Butterflies of Asia
Butterflies of Europe
Lepidoptera of Cape Verde
Fauna of Santo Antão, Cape Verde
Butterflies described in 1767
Taxa named by Carl Linnaeus